Nordlunde is a hamlet on the island of Lolland, Denmark. It is about 7 kilometers from Nakskov, the main city of Lolland. Nordlunde has about 100 citizens. In the past, Nordlunde had a school, an inn, a small store, an agriculture factory and a smithy, it also had a telephone central and a mill at Moellevang. Currently the hamlet only contains a store of used goods. The small church, without a tower, was built in the 12th century and contains a small graveyard.

Villages in Denmark
Lolland Municipality